Gertrude Martin (1911 – February 1952), became one of an elite group of women master mosaicists.

Family
Born to George Martin, a retired Insurance Brokers Clerk, and his wife Harriett She was baptized at St Peter's Church, Dulwich on 18 January 1882 and spent her childhood at various addresses in Croydon.

Career
Along with her sisters Margaret and Dora, Gertrude was apprenticed to George Bridge, an artist and worker in mosaics, who had a business premise in Mitcham Park and a studio in Oxford Street.  In 1902 George and his 26 women mosaicists began an extended period of work in Westminster Cathedral.  Gertrude studied mosaics in Ravenna, Milan and Venice, and along with her sister Margaret was employed on some prestigious commissions.  In the 1920s the sisters worked on two arched panels in the Central Lobby in the Houses of Parliament.  Designed by Robert Anning Bell the mosaic depicting St Andrew was completed in 1923 and St Patrick in 1924.  Between 1928-1932 Gertrude and Margaret worked at St Anne's Cathedral, Belfast, designing and producing mosaics in the Baptistry, the Chapel of Holy Spirit, the tympanum above the West Doors and the mural of St Patrick above the entrance to the Chapel of the Holy Spirit.

Death
Gertrude died at her home in St James's Crescent.

References

1. ^http://www.westminstercathedral.org.uk/tour_mosaics.php

"Chapters of Gold: The Life of Mary in Mosaics" By Rachel Billington, Publisher: Burns & Oates (October 20, 2005)

External links
 
 https://www.flickr.com/photos/uk_parliament/8222763693/
 https://web.archive.org/web/20150518233937/http://www.belfastcathedral.org/heritage/artists-and-sculptors/
 http://www.ipernity.com/doc/302051/18737465
 
 https://web.archive.org/web/20160304113557/http://www.focusfeatures.com/photo/london__the_lady_chapel_in_westminster_cathedral
 http://www.margaretalmon.com/my-entry-2/

English artists
Mosaic artists
1911 births
1952 deaths